In computing, the count–min sketch (CM sketch) is a probabilistic data structure that serves as a frequency table of events in a stream of data. It uses hash functions to map events to frequencies, but unlike a hash table uses only sub-linear space, at the expense of overcounting some events due to collisions. The count–min sketch was invented in 2003 by Graham Cormode and S. Muthu Muthukrishnan and described by them in a 2005 paper.

Count–min sketches are essentially the same data structure as the counting Bloom filters introduced in 1998 by Fan et al. However, they are used differently and therefore sized differently: a count–min sketch typically has a sublinear number of cells, related to the desired approximation quality of the sketch, while a counting Bloom filter is more typically sized to match the number of elements in the set.

Data structure
The goal of the basic version of the count–min sketch is to consume a stream of events, one at a time, and count the frequency of the different types of events in the stream. At any time, the sketch can be queried for the frequency of a particular event type  from a universe of event types , and will return an estimate of this frequency that is within a certain distance of the true frequency, with a certain probability.

The actual sketch data structure is a two-dimensional array of  columns and  rows. Associated with each of the  rows is a separate hash function; the hash functions must be pairwise independent.

When a new event of type  arrives we update as follows: for each row  of the table, apply the corresponding hash function to obtain a column index . Then increment the value in row , column  by one.

Several types of queries are possible on the stream.

 The simplest is the point query, which asks for the count of an event type .

Obviously, for each , one has , where  is the true frequency with which  occurred in the stream.

Additionally, this estimate has the guarantee that  with probability , where  is the stream size, i.e. the total number of items seen by the sketch.

Small modifications to the data structure can be used to sketch other different stream statistics.

Like the Count sketch, the Count–min sketch is a linear sketch. That is, given two streams, constructing a sketch on each stream and summing the sketches yields the same result as concatenating the streams and constructing a sketch on the concatenated streams. This makes the sketch mergeable and appropriate for use in distributed settings in addition to streaming ones.

Reducing bias and error
One potential problem with the usual min estimator for count–min sketches is that they are biased estimators of the true frequency of events: they may overestimate, but never underestimate the true count in a point query. Furthermore, while the min estimator works well when the distribution is highly skewed, other sketches such as the Count sketch based on means are more accurate when the distribution is not sufficiently skewed. Several variations on the sketch have been proposed to reduce error and reduce or eliminate bias.

To remove bias, the hCount* estimator

repeatedly randomly selects d random entries in the sketch and takes the minimum to obtain an unbiased estimate of the bias and subtracts it off.

A maximum likelihood estimator (MLE) was derived in Ting. By using the MLE, the estimator is always able to match or better the min estimator and works well even if the distribution is not skewed. This paper also showed the hCount* debiasing operation is a bootstrapping procedure that can be efficiently computed without random sampling and can be generalized to any estimator.

Since errors arise from hash collisions with unknown items from the universe, several approaches correct for the collisions when multiple elements of the universe are known or queried for simultaneously 

. For each of these, a large proportion of the universe must be known to observe a significant benefit.

Conservative updating changes the update, but not the query algorithms. To count  instances of event type , one first computes an estimate , then updates  for each row . While this update procedure makes the sketch not a linear sketch, it is still mergeable.

See also
 Feature hashing
 Locality-sensitive hashing
 MinHash
 Count sketch

Notes

References

Further reading

External links
 Count–min FAQ

Hashing
Probabilistic data structures
Hash based data structures